Detlef Gerstenberg (5 March 1957 – 24 January 1993) was a hammer thrower from East Germany, who competed at the 1980 Summer Olympics for his native country. Born in Eisenhüttenstadt, Brandenburg he died of cirrhosis aged 35 in Berlin.

International competitions

References
sports-reference

1957 births
1993 deaths
Sportspeople from Eisenhüttenstadt
People from Bezirk Frankfurt
German male hammer throwers
East German male hammer throwers
Olympic athletes of East Germany
Athletes (track and field) at the 1980 Summer Olympics
Deaths from cirrhosis
Alcohol-related deaths in Germany